Dean Horribine (born 14 January 1993) is a Scottish footballer who plays as a midfielder for Spartans. He has previously played for Hibernian and Berwick Rangers. He now plays for top Edinburgh amateur side, St Bernard's AFC.

Career
Horribine joined the Hibernian (Hibs) youth system in 2002. After agreeing a one-year contract with Hibs in May 2012, he played regularly for their under-20 side during the 2012–13 season. Horribine made his debut appearance for Hibs in a 3–1 win against Kilmarnock on 15 May 2013. Horribine was released from his contract with Hibs at the end of the 2013–14 season.

Horribine then signed for Berwick Rangers, having already played for the club as a trialist in a Scottish Challenge Cup tie. He was released from his contract by mutual consent on 10 February 2015.

Following his release from Berwick, Horribine signed for Lowland Football League club Spartans.

Career statistics

References

External links
Hibernian F.C. profile

1993 births
Living people
Footballers from Edinburgh
Scottish footballers
Association football midfielders
Hibernian F.C. players
Scottish Premier League players
Scottish Professional Football League players
Berwick Rangers F.C. players